Peter Ingwersen (born 10 October 1962 in Copenhagen) is a Danish fashion designer.

Life
Ingwersen grew up on his parents' farm outside of Kolding, then went to study at the Danish School of Design. Today he lives in the centre of Copenhagen.

Career
His working life began with an internship at Levi's in Brussels (Belgium) as part of the third year of his studies, which was immediately followed with a job offer. He continued to work for them for almost 20 years, becoming director of Levi’s Europe, based in Brussels.

In 2001 he returned to his hometown and became managing director of the label DAY Birger et Mikkelsen.

Then in 2004 he founded fashion label NOIR and the cotton fabric brand ILLUMINATI II with the aim of combining luxurious fashion with ecological responsibility and sustainable practice. ILLUMINATI II works to develop the production in Uganda of ethically produced organic cotton following United Nations Global Compact principles, and to promote the use of the fabric across luxury brands. The glamorous NOIR label brings this corporate social responsibility approach to fruition in sophisticated collections, which have been described as “sexy with fetish undertones”, created from silk, wool, cotton and fur, all with ethical certification.

References

External links
Official website of ILLUMINATI II, NOIR and BLLACK NOIR

Danish fashion designers
1962 births
Living people